The 53rd Venice Biennale was an international contemporary art exhibition held in 2009. The Venice Biennale takes place biennially in Venice, Italy. Artistic director Daniel Birnbaum curated its central exhibition, "Making Worlds".

Awards 

 Golden Lion for best artist of the exhibition: Tobias Rehberger
 Silver Lion for the most promising young artist of the exhibition: Nathalie Djurberg
 Golden Lions for lifetime achievement: Yoko Ono and John Baldessari
 Golden Lion for best national participation: American pavilion with Bruce Nauman (Topological Gardens)

References

Further reading 

 
 
 
 
 
 
 
 
 
 
 
 
 
 
 
 
 
 
 
 
 
 
 
 
 
 
 
 
 
 
 
 
 
 
 
 
 

2009 in art
2009 in Italy
Venice Biennale exhibitions